Phosphoglyceric acid may refer to:

 2-Phosphoglyceric acid
 3-Phosphoglyceric acid